Neochlamisus scabripennis is a species of warty leaf beetle in the family Chrysomelidae. It is found in Central America and North America.

References

Further reading

 

Cryptocephalinae
Articles created by Qbugbot
Beetles described in 1926